The Bhagirathi Hooghly River (Anglicized alternatively spelled Hoogli or Hugli) or the 'Bhāgirathi-Hooghly', called the Ganga or the Kati-Ganga in the Puranas, rises close to Giria, which is north of Baharampur and Palashi, in Murshidabad. The main course of the Ganges then flows into Bangladesh as the Padma. A man-made canal called the Farakka Feeder Canal connects the Ganges to the Bhagirathi to bring the abundant waters of the Himalayan river to the narrow river that rises in West Bengal.

The river flows through the Rarh region, the lower deltaic districts of West Bengal, and eventually into the Bay of Bengal. The upper riparian zone of the river is called Bhagirathi while the lower riparian zone is called Hooghly. Major and minor rivers that drain into the Bhagirathi-Hooghly include the Ajay, Falgu, Jalangi and Churni to the north and Rupnarayan, Mayurakshi, Damodar and  Haldi to the south. Major cities that stand on the banks of the Hooghly are Baharampur, Durgapur, Kalyani, Tribeni, Saptagram, Bandel, Hugli, Chandannagar, Srirampur, Barrackpur, Rishra, Uttarpara, Titagarh, Kamarhati, Agarpara, Baranagar, Howrah, Kolkata and Uluberia. 

Like the Ganges, the Hooghly is held sacred to Hindus.

Course 

The vast majority of the water that flows into the Hooghly River is provided by the man-made Farakka Feeder Canal, rather than the natural source of the river at Giria. The Farakka Barrage is a dam that diverts water from the Ganges into the Farakka Feeder Canal near the town of Tildanga in Murshidabad district, located 40  km upstream from Giria. This supplies the Hooghly with water as per the agreement between India and Bangladesh. The feeder canal runs parallel to the Ganges, past Dhulian, until just above Jahangirpur where the canal ends and joins the Bhagirathi river. The Bhagirathi then flows south past Jiaganj Azimganj, Murshidabad, and Baharampur. South of Baharampur and north of Palashi it used to form the border between Bardhaman District and Nadia District, but while the border has remained the same the river is now often east or west of its former bed. The river then flows south past Katwa, Nabadwip, Kalna and Jirat. At Kalna it originally formed the border between Nadia District and Hooghly District, and then further south between Hooghly District and North 24 Parganas District. It flows past Halisahar, Chinsurah, Naihati, Bhatpara, Konnagar, Serampore, and Kamarhati. Then, just before entering the twin cities of Kolkata (Calcutta) and Howrah, it turns to the southwest.

Ain-i-Akbari, a book by Abu'l-Fazl, describes that the river Ganga and river Sarwasati (Sarsuti) streams of lower Bengal had different flows. According to the footnotes of this book, the colour of the water of the Sarawasati was white, the colour of another stream named Jamuna was blue, and the colour of the Ganga was muddy and yellowish. From Kolkata the main flow of the Hooghly-Bhagirathi (or Ganga) used to run along the side of the Kalighat temple, Baruipur, Jaynagar, Chhatrabhog and Hatiagarh. At that time, between Khiderpore and Sankrail no flow existed. Presently, the stream between Khiderpore and Sankrail became known as KatiGanga. A channel had been dug at the time of Alibardi Khan in the middle of the 18th century. This happened with the assistance of Dutch traders, who also set up a toll point on the Hooghly river. So the present reach of the Hooghly is the lower part of the historical Saraswati. Kolkata the capital of West Bengal is located on the banks of the Hoogly river.

Tidal bore 

The tide runs rapidly on the Hooghly, and produces a remarkable example of the fluvial phenomenon known as a tidal bore. This consists of the head-wave of the advancing tide, hemmed in where the estuary narrows suddenly into the river, and often exceeds  in height. It is felt as high up as Naihati 35 km upstream of Calcutta, and frequently destroys small boats. A tidal bore which overcame the banks of the river in 1876 was reported to have killed up to a hundred thousand people. The difference from the lowest point of low-water in the dry season to the highest point of high-water in the rains is reported to be .

History 
In its upper reaches the river is generally known as the Bhāgirathi, until it reaches Hooghly. The word Bhāgirathi literally means "caused by Bhagiratha", a mythical Sagar Dynasty prince who was instrumental in bringing the river Ganges from the heavens on to the earth, in order to release his 60,000 grand-uncles from a curse of the saint Kapila.

In 1974, the Farakka Barrage began diverting water into the Hooghly during the dry season so as to reduce the silting difficulties at Kolkata's port.

Like the rest of the Ganges, the Bhāgirathi-Hooghly is considered sacred to Hindus, and its water is considered holy.

Bridges and Tunnels 

The following bridges currently span the Hooghly/Bhagirathi River; listed from south to north (mouth to source), until the Farakka Feeder Canal meets the river:

Vidyasagar Setu (Second Hooghly Bridge)- inaugurated in October 1992, connecting Howrah and Kolkata
Rabindra Setu (Howrah Bridge) - inaugurated in February 1943, connecting Howrah and Kolkata
Nivedita Setu (Second Vivekananda Bridge) - inaugurated in July 2007, connecting Bally and Dakhineswar; runs adjacent to Vivekananda Setu
Vivekananda Setu (Bally Bridge; road and rail bridge) - inaugurated in December 1932, connecting Bally and Dakhineswar; runs adjacent to Nivedita Setu
Sampreeti Setu (New Jubilee Bridge; rail only) - inaugurated in August 2016, connecting Bandel and Naihati; replaced the now-decommissioned Jubilee Bridge
Ishwar Gupta Setu (Kalyani Bridge) - inaugurated in 1989, connecting Bansberia and Kalyani
 Gouranga Setu - connecting Nabadwip and Krishnanagar
 Ramendra Sundar Tribedi Setu - connecting Khagraghat and Baharampur
 Jangipur Bhagirathi Bridge - connecting Raghunathganj and Jangipur

The following bridges are under various stages of development:

Nashipur Rail Bridge (rail only) - partially constructed; connecting Azimganj and Murshidabad
 New Bhagirathi Bridge - connecting Basudev Khali and Haridasmati
 Kalna - Shantipur Bridge - announced
 Fuleshwar - Budge Budge Bridge - announced
The following tunnels are situated under the Hooghly River :-

 CESC Tunnel - This tunnel is using for electric power transmission between Kolkata and Howrah. It is the first underwater tunnel of Asia, as well as India. The construction of this tunnel was completed in 1931.
 East West Metro Tunnel - The tunnel is been completed in 2021. This tunnel is the first underwater river railway tunnel in India. It is a metro railway tunnel, connecting Kolkata to Howrah.

Economics 
The Bhāgirathi-Hooghly river system is an essential lifeline for the people of West Bengal. It was through this river that the East India company sailed into Bengal and established their trade settlement, Calcutta, the capital of British India. People from other countries such as the French, Dutch, Portuguese, etc. all had their trade settlements by the banks of this river.

The river provides a perennial supply of water to the plain of West Bengal for irrigation and human & industry consumption. The river is navigable and a major transport system in the region with a large traffic flow. For a long time, the Calcutta Port was the biggest port of India. Although in the past its significance had gone down, recently it has reached the 3rd position in the list of Indian Ports. The modern container port of Haldia, on the intersection of lower Hooghly and Haldi River, now carries much of the region's maritime trade. One new port will be built in the deep sea to reduce the load on Calcutta port.

Despite the river being polluted, the fish from it are important to the local economy.

The Hooghly river valley was the most important industrial area of the state of Bengal. Despite a decline of the jute industry, the prime industry of this region, it is still one of the biggest industrial areas of India. It has a number of small cities which form the Greater Kolkata agglomeration, the second biggest Indian city and the former capital.

In September 2015, the Government of West Bengal announced that renovation of the Hooghly riverfront in Kolkata will be completed with the help of World Bank funding under the National Ganga River Basin Project Scheme.

Hooghly River in arts

Literature
Rudyard Kipling wrote an article, On the Banks of the Hugli (1888), and a short story set on the Hooghli, An Unqualified Pilot (1895).

Cultural events
The Silk River project aims at exploring the artistic relationship between Kolkata and London through artistic exchange from 10 locations each along the Hooghly River and the River Thames. The 10 places along the Hooghly River are Murshidabad, Krishnagar, Chandernagore, Barrackpore, Jorasanko, Bowbazar, Howrah, Kidderpore, Botanical Gardens and Batanagar. Ten scrolls, painted in the Patua tradition, depicting the 10 places will be carried along the Hooghly River. The event began at Murshidabad on 7 December 2017 and ended at the Victoria Memorial, Kolkata on 17 December.

Gallery

See also
 List of rivers of India
 Kolkata Eye

References

External links

 Hugli River at NASA Earth Observatory
 Hooghly District Information

Distributaries of the Ganges
Rivers of West Bengal
Geography of Kolkata
Howrah
Sundarbans
Tourism in West Bengal
Rivers of India